Cetopangasius chaetobranchus is an extinct species of catfish of the family Pangasiidae. This fish was from a Miocene lake fauna from what is now Ban Nong Pia, Phetchabun Province of Thailand.

References

Pangasiidae
Miocene fish of Asia
Catfish genera
Fish described in 1999